Kyriakakis is a Greek surname. Notable people with the surname include:

Chris Kyriakakis (born 1963), Greek professor of electrical engineering, author, and inventor
Giorgos Kyriakakis (born 1967), Greek composer

Greek-language surnames